Gilalite is a copper silicate mineral with chemical composition of Cu5Si6O17·7(H2O). 

It occurs as a retrograde metamorphic phase in a calc-silicate and sulfide skarn deposit. It occurs as fracture fillings and incrustations associated with diopside crystals.  It is commonly found in the form of spherules of radial fibers.

It was first described for an occurrence in the Christmas porphyry copper mine in Gila County, Arizona in 1980 along with the mineral apachite. It derives its name from this locality. It has also been reported from the Goodsprings District, Clark County, Nevada; Juazeiro do Norte, Ceara State, Brazil and a slag area in Lavrion District, Attica, Greece.

References

Copper(II) minerals
Unclassified silicates
Monoclinic minerals